Sherlock Holmes and Doctor Watson is a television series created by Sheldon Reynolds and based on characters and storylines from Sir Arthur Conan Doyle's Sherlock Holmes stories. It starred Geoffrey Whitehead, Donald Pickering and Patrick Newell in the title roles of Sherlock Holmes, Doctor Watson and Inspector Lestrade respectively. The series is considered rather obscure, and was filmed on a relatively low budget in Poland. The series combined adaptations of Arthur Conan Doyle's source stories with original screenplays that saw Holmes face brand new cases.

Before the series finished production, British publisher Grandreams Ltd. prepared a printed, hard-cover volume titled Sherlock Holmes & Doctor Watson Annual, which adapted the show's storylines in comic book form, with Holmes, Watson and Lestrade drawn to the likenesses of Geoffrey Whitehead, Donald Pickering, and Patrick Newell. The volume was eventually released in 1979, even though the series itself was not broadcast in the UK (where it was originally supposed to be distributed by ITV plc).

Production
Sheldon Reynolds structured a deal with the state Polish Television to take over Poltel Studios to produce television shows. Anthony Burgess was brought on as a consultant. Reynolds recycled some aspects from his earlier 1954 television series starring Ronald Howard such as scripts and even the conceit of having Inspector Lestrade an equal co-star with Holmes and Watson.

Filming was done for low cost and co-star Pickering remarked "The schedule for filming was very hectic and there were the odd dangerous moments. I remember once that the shafts of a hansom cab snapped when we were in hot pursuit of a suspect. That was very hairy!"

Most scenes of the episodes were filmed in Warsaw, as well as in the manors and palace buildings of Nieborów.

According to guest director Roy Ward Baker, as production wrapped up the head of Polish television who had spearheaded the deal was arrested for corruption. The films were confiscated leading to inconsistent distribution; the show was never released in the U.K. and aired on a single U.S. station in 1982. (In fact, the then-president of Telewizja Polska, Maciej Szczepański, was charged with misuse of state funds, after an audit in 1980; one of the charges concerned Sherlock Holmes and Doctor Watson, which, the auditors claimed, was assigned too high a budget, and which proved to be a financial loss to the television. Szczepański himself stated that the charges against him were politically motivated, and had stemmed from conflicts inside the PZPR; he declared that Sherlock Holmes and Doctor Watson was, in fact, one of the most profitable series to have ever been produced by Telewizja Polska, with distribution rights sold to 25 countries).

Reception
The legal issues caused the series' release to be delayed, leading to the cancellation of its broadcast in several markets. Eventually, however, the series premiered on Polish TV, and was embraced by the viewers, leading to regular re-runs; it was also briefly parodied in an episode of the comedy series Alternatywy 4. After the political regime change of 1989, the series continued to be broadcast in Poland.

Sherlock Holmes and Doctor Watson was also broadcast in other countries, including Germany, where, dubbed in German, it premiered in 1982 on ZDF (with later broadcasts on other channels, including Sat.1), and was received positively as well. Geoffrey Whitehead's portrayal of Sherlock Holmes was particularly praised for its faithfulness to the character's original description by Arthur Conan Doyle, and the effortless switching between his multiple facets - the cold, emotionlessly objective and analytical detective, the refined Victorian gentleman, and the ruthless pursuer of criminals. The series' depiction of Doctor Watson was also noted: where many adaptations of Arthur Conan Doyle's stories tended to show Watson as little more than a sidekick, comic relief, or even a clownish buffoon, Donald Pickering's portrayal of Watson was faithful to Conan Doyle's description, and presented the character as an intelligent, composed and observant man, and Holmes's efficient and trusted partner. The fully orchestral score, composed by Ervin Drake and arranged and conducted by Stanisław Syrewicz, was praised as well, for its rich atmosphere and Victorian ambience. Several local stations broadcast the series in 1982 in the United States as well, to positive reception; reviewer Peter Farrell of The Oregonian described the actors as "excellent", and stated: "This Holmes could easily be habit-forming".

Episodes

References

External links

1979 British television series debuts
1980 British television series endings
Television series set in the 19th century
Sherlock Holmes television series
1970s British mystery television series
1980s British mystery television series
Television shows filmed in Poland